Ponti Anak Remaja is a Malaysian miniseries about Ponti, a human-vampire half-breed who just wants a normal human life. She is fascinated with the human world after she met a group of college students doing a research of a mythical flower in a local reserved forest which is actually inhabited by the vampires. She became friends with the students. They manage to somehow enroll her in the college, and unlike any other normal human, she has the ability to learn fast and other few super abilities.

Ponti herself is a bubbly, fun, energetic and friendly girl who just wants to fit in the social. She started dating Hazuan, the popular guy. Hazuan's ex-girlfriend Sofea became furious and hated this so she planned to make Ponti's life a living hell. Ponti also has to face Kamal, her vampire ex-boyfriend who would do anything to win her back.

See also
Vampire film
List of vampire television series

Malaysian speculative fiction television series
Vampires in television